The Rainmaker is the sixth studio album by the progressive rock band The Flower Kings. It was their first to receive a more mixed response from critics compared to their previous albums.

Track listing

Personnel
Roine Stolt - vocals, guitars, additional keyboards
Tomas Bodin - keyboards
Hasse Fröberg - vocals
Jonas Reingold - bass guitar
Jaime Salazar - drums
with
Hasse Bruniusson - percussion
Ulf Wallander - soprano saxophone

References

2001 albums
The Flower Kings albums
Inside Out Music albums